Escale au Grand Rex was the sixth live album by Bernard Lavilliers, recorded at the Grand Rex in 2005 and is his most recent live album released to date. The album reached number 18 in France and number 48 in Wallonia, Belgium.

Track listing 
Translations of some tracks include "Voyageur" (traveler), "Elle chante" (she sings), "Noir et blanc" (black and white), "État des lieux" (state of a place, literally state of mind), "La Peur" (the fear), "Chanson dada" (dada song), "Le mains d'or" (The golden hand) and "Attention fragile" (gentle warning).

Disc 1

Disc 2

Personnel 
 Xavier Tribolet – keyboards, accordion, vocals
Vincent Faucher – guitars, vocals
 Thierry Fanfant – bass, counter-bass, vocals
Gil Gimenez – drumset, vocals
David Donatien – percussion, vocals

Chart performance

References

External links 

2005 live albums